210th may refer to:

210th Battalion (Frontiersmen), CEF, a unit in the Canadian Expeditionary Force during the First World War
210th Coastal Defense Division (Germany), created in July 1942, and shipped north to defend the port Petsamo in Arctic Finland
210th Fires Brigade (United States), constituted on 21 September 1917 in the Regular Army as Headquarters, 2d Field Artillery Brigade
210th Rescue Squadron, a unit of the Alaska Air National Guard

See also
210th Street – Williamsbridge (IRT Third Avenue Line), the penultimate station on the demolished IRT Third Avenue Line
210 (number)
210, the year 210 (CCX) of the Julian calendar